A list of Jewish historians:

A
David Abulafia, professor of history, University of Cambridge (Jewish Year Book 2005, p. 218)
Henry Abramson, Touro College, Eastern European Jewish Historian.
Ignác Acsády, Hungarian social and economic historian
Howard Adelson, U.S. mediaeval historian
Cyrus Adler, U.S. historian of Jewish history
Geoffrey Alderman, historian
Mor Altshuler, Israeli historian of early Hasidism, Kabbalism, and Jewish messianism
Iosif Amusin, Soviet historian
Anne Applebaum, U.S. journalist, writer on the history of the Soviet Union, Russia, Central and Eastern Europe
Herbert Aptheker, leader in Communist Party, historian
Yitzhak Arad, Israeli historian of the Shoah
Yehoshua Arieli, Israeli historian
Walter Leonard Arnstein, U.S. historian
Raymond Aron, French historian of sociology
Robert Aron, French author and journalist
Artapanus of Alexandria, 2nd Century BC historian who lived in Alexandria, Egypt
David Asheri, Israeli classical historian
Simon Ashkenazi, Polish modern European history
Robert Assaraf, Moroccan writer and historian
David Ayalon, Israeli historian of Islam and Judaism

B
Bernard Bailyn, U.S. Colonial historian
Richard Barnett, museum curator and archaeologist (JYB 1985 p. 187)
Salo Wittmayer Baron, American historian of Polish-Austrian Jewish ancestry
Omer Bartov, U.S. historian of World War II and Polish Jews
Yehuda Bauer, Czech-born Israeli historian of the Holocaust
Zygmunt Bauman, Anglo-Polish scholar who examines the relationship between modernity and the Holocaust
Yitzhak Bayer, History of the Jews
George Louis Beer, U.S. historian of 16th-19th century commerce
Emile-Auguste Begin, French physician, historian and librarian
Max Beloff, English historian and political scientist
Benjamin of Tudela, travel writer 1159-73
Shlomo Ben-Ami, Israeli historian and politician
Joaquim Bensaude Portuguese historian of astronomy and navigation
Norman Bentwich, British lawyer and historian
Israil Bercovici, Romanian playwright and historian 
Jay R. Berkovitz, U.S. historian of Jews in France and early modern Europe
Isaiah Berlin, Latvian-born British historian of ideas
Harry Bernstein, U.S. historian
Elias Joseph Bickerman, U.S. scholar of ancient history
Camille Bloch, French historian, archivist and librarian
Gustave Bloch, French Graeco-Roman historian
Herbert Bloch, German-born American classicist
Marc Bloch, French historian of medieval France
Solomon Frank Bloom, U.S. historian of modern Europe
Jerome Blum, U.S. historian
Grigory Bongard-Levin, Russian historian
Daniel Boorstin, U.S. historian; official historian at the Smithsonian Institution & the Library of Congress
Woodrow Wilson Borah, U.S. historian
Randolph L. Braham U.S. historian of Hungarian Jewish ancestry; historian of the Holocaust in Hungary
Ambrosio Brandao, Portuguese historian and soldier
Ahron Bregman, author and journalist on the Arab-Israeli conflict
Harry Bresslau, German historian
Berthold Bretholz, Moravian historian
Alan Brinkley, historian, provost of Columbia University
Jacob Bronowski, historian of science 
Robert Brunschvig, French historian of Islam
Max Buedinger, German modern European historian

C
Norman Cantor, mediaeval historian
David Cesarani, British professor of history
Robert Chazan medievalist
Achille Coen, Italian historian
David Cohen, Dutch historian and Jewish leader
Gustave Cohen, Belgian historian of mediaeval French literature and theatre
Mark Cohen, American historian of the Jews under medieval Islam
Norman Cohn, British historian 
Robert Cohen, French historian of ancient Greece
Stephen F. Cohen, American historian of the Soviet Union 
Michael Confino, Israeli historian
Martin van Creveld, Dutch-born Israeli military historian

D
Robert Davidsohn, German historian of mediaeval Florence
Natalie Zemon Davis, American historian of France
Lucy Dawidowicz, American Holocaust historian
Hermann Dessau, German historian and philologist
Isaac Deutscher, Polish-born British Marxist historian and political scientist
Max Dimont, Finnish-American Jew and popular historian and author
Martin Duberman, U.S. historian and playwright
Simon Dubnow, Russian-born Latvian historian; author of the "History of the Jews"; shot by Nazis
Ariel Durant, American historian; author of The Story of Civilization.

E
Abba Eban, Israeli writer about Israeli and Jewish history
Ludwig Edelstein, ancient medicine
Alfred Edersheim Australian Jewish historian and Biblical scholar
Victor Ehrenberg, German historian of the ancient world
Louis Eisenman, French historian of Europe
Abraham Eisenstadt, U.S. historian
Stanley Elkins, U.S. historian
Amos Elon, Vienna-born Israeli. Historian of Germany and modern Israel
Geoffrey Rudolph Elton, German-born British historian of Tudor England
Carlo Errera, Italian geographer and historian of exploration
Richard Ettinghausen, German-born U.S. art historian

F
Orlando Figes, British historian of Russia
Louis Filler, U.S. historian
Sidney Fine, U.S. historian
Samuel Finer, British political scientist and historian 
Norman Finkelstein, American historian
Moses I. Finley, Classical Historian.
Simha Flapan, Israeli historian
Robert Fogel, American economic historian and Nobel laureate 
Eric Foner, American historian and president of American Historical Association 2000
Joseph Friedenson, Holocaust historian
Heinrich Friedjung, Moravian historian and politician
Henry Friedlander, German-born American historian of the Holocaust 
Saul Friedländer, Czech-born French-Israeli historian of the Holocaust
Yisrael Friedman, former lecturer at the Tel Aviv University and the Ben-Gurion University of the Negev
Alexander Fuks, Israeli classical historian

G
Peter Gay, German-born American historian of ideas
Leo Gershoy, U.S. historian
Felix Gilbert, U.S. political historian
Martin Gilbert, British historian
Carlo Ginzburg, Italian historian
Gustave Glotz, French ancient Greek historian
Shelomo Dov Goitein Arabist, historian, ethnographer
Eric F. Goldman, U.S. modern historian
Yosef Goldman, author of Hebrew Printing in America
Yossi Goldstein, Israeli biographer
Ernst Gombrich, Austrian-born British art historian
Martin Goodman (historian) (Jewish Year Book 2005 p. 215)
Gabriel Gorodetsky, historian of Second World War
Louis Reichenthal Gottschalk, U.S. historian of modern Europe
Heinrich Graetz, Polish-born German historian
Jack Granatstein, Canadian military historian
Jacob Greenwald, Master of European History University of Haifa
Jan T. Gross, Polish historian
Philip Guedalla, biographer 
Hans G. Guterbock, German-born hittitologist

H
Joseph Hakohen, 16th century historian, Italy
Elie Halevy, French historian, "A History of the English People in the 19th century 1915-30"
George W. F. Hallgarten, historian
Louis Halphen, French mediaevalist
Theodore Stephen Hamerow, U.S. historian
Marceli Handelsman, Polish constitutional and political historian
Oscar Handlin, U.S. social historian
Abraham Harkavy, Belarusian-born Russian historian
Henry Harrisse, U.S. historiographer
Ludo Moritz Hartmann, Austrian historian and statesman
Henri Hauser, French ancient and mediaeval historian
Sigmund Herzberg-Fraenkel, Austrian historian
Jack H. Hexter, U.S. historian of modern Europe
Uriel Heyd, Israeli historian of Islam
Raul Hilberg, Austrian-born American Holocaust historian
Gertrude Himmelfarb, American historian of Victorian Britain
Heinrich Otto Hirschfield, German Roman historian
Eric Hobsbawm, Egyptian-born British Marxist historian
Richard Hofstadter, U.S. political historian
David Horowitz, American historian
Helen Lefkowitz Horowitz, American historian
Irving Howe, American historian
Samuel Justin Hurwitz, U.S. historian
Harold Melvin Hyman, U.S. historian

I
Siegfried Isaacsohn, German historian
Jonathan Israel, British historian (Jewish Year Book 2005, p. 215)

J
Joseph Jacobs , editor of the Jewish Encyclopedia
Oscar Isaiah Janowsky, U.S. historian of modern Europe and Jews
Lisa Jardine, British historian (ref see List of British Jews#Historians)
Louis de Jong, Dutch historian and journalist
Matthew Josephson, U.S. social historian
Titus Flavius Josephus, ancient Jewish historian

K
Donald Kagan, American historian of ancient Greece
Frederick Kagan, American military historian
David Kahn, American historian of cryptography
Ernst Kantorowicz, German-born American mediaevalist
Efraim Karsh, Israeli historian
Jacob Katz, was Professor Emeritus, Faculty of Social Sciences, Hebrew University of Jerusalem, and author or editor of many books on medieval and modern Jewish social history
Steven T. Katz, U.S. historian of the Holocaust
Shmuel Katz, Israeli historian
Solomon Katz, U.S. historian
Elie Kedourie, Iraq-born British historian (Jewish Year Book 1990 p. 202)
Morton Keller, U.S. historian
Abraham Khalfon, Jewish historian of Tripoli
James Klugmann, communist historian 
Richard Koebner, Israeli German historian
Hans Kohn, U.S. political and social historian
Hilton Kramer, American art historian
Michael Kraus, U.S. historian
Leonard Krieger, U.S. historian
Hyman Kublin, U.S. historian of the far east
Thomas Samuel Kuhn, U.S. historian of science
Otto Kurz, historian (Jewish Year Book 1975 p. 214)

L
Leopold Labedz, Anglo-Polish historian of Communism
Gyula Lanczy, Hungarian economic historian
David Landes, U.S. economic historian
Benno Landsberger, Austrian-born assyriologist
Thomas Laqueur, UC Berkeley professor, historian of Britain since 1509: social, medical and sexual historian
Walter Laqueur, German-born American historian of modern Europe, the Middle East & terrorism
Max Laserson, Latvian historian
Michael Ledeen, American historian of Fascism
Sidney Lee, second editor of the Dictionary of National Biography
Arthur Lefkowitz, American historian of the American Revolution
Mary Lefkowitz, American classical scholar
Gerda Lerner, Austrian-born American feminist historian
Max Lerner, U.S. journalist and social historian
Joseph Levenson, U.S. specialist in Chinese history
Wilhelm Levison, German mediaevalist
Arthur Levy, French historian
Leonard William Levy, U.S. political historian
, French linguistic historian
Bernard Lewis, British orientalist, History of Islam
David Malcolm Lewis, British historian. (Jewish Year Book 1995 p. 193)
Felix Liebermann, German mediaevalist
Ephraim Lipson, British economic historian
Deborah Lipstadt, U.S. Holocaust historian
Victor Loewe, German historian and archivist
Robert Sabatino Lopez, U.S. mediaevalist
Sidney Low, British statesman, journalist and political historian
Samuel Lozinski, Russian historian
John Lukacs, Hungarian-US historian
Alberto Lumbroso, Italian historian of the Napoleonic period
Giacomo Lumbroso, Italian classical historian and archaeologist

M
Hyam Maccoby
Lothar Machtan
Philip Magnus-Allcroft, biographer 
Frank Manuel, U.S. historian
Henrik Marczali, Hungarian historian
Shula Marks, South African-British expert on African history (Jewish Year Book 2005 p. 215)
Ludwig Markus, German expert in Abyssinian and Beta Israeli history
Michael Marrus, Canadian Shoah historian
Karl Marx, historian and philosopher
Arno J. Mayer, Luxembourg-born American historian
Gustav Mayer, German political and social historian
Milton Meltzer, American historian of Afro-American history
Ezra Mendelsohn, Polish historian of the Jewish community in Poland
Isaak Mints, Ukrainian-born Russian historian
Mark Borisovich Mitin, Russian politician and historian
Arnaldo Momigliano, Italian-British historian.(Jewish Year Book 1985 p. 188)
Felice Momigliano, Italian philosopher and historian
Benny Morris, Israeli historian of Israel
Richard Brandon Morris, U.S. constitutional historian
Louis C. Morton, U.S. historian
George Mosse, German-born American historian of ideas
Salomon Munk, German-born French historian
Friederich Munzer, German classical scholar
Gustavus Myers, U.S. social historian

N
Nadav Na`aman, Israeli historian of biblical times
Oskar Nachod, German historian and bibliographer
Lewis Bernstein Namier, Polish-born British historian
Abraham Nasatir, U.S. historian of west and southwest U.S.
Alexander Nove, economic historian (Jewish Year Book 1990 p. 202)

O
Julius Oppert, Assyriologist
Michael Oren, Israeli historian
Leo Oppenheim, Assyriologist

P
Abraham Pais, Dutch-born American historian
Francis Palgrave, British historian
Erwin Panofsky, German-born American art historian
Ilan Pappé, Israeli historian
Peter Paret, German-born American historian of German history
Herbert S. Parmet, political historian and biographer
Robert D. Parmet, labor and immigration historian and biographer
Max Perlbach, German mediaevalist
Martin Phillipson, German modern historian and communal leader
Koppel Pinson, U.S. political and social historian
Daniel Pipes, American historian of the Middle East
Richard Pipes, Polish-born American historian of Russia
Karl Polanyi, economist and historian 
Leon Poliakov, French historian of anti-semitism
Sidney Pomerantz, U.S. historian
Richard Popkin, historian of philosophy 
Yehoshua Porath, Israeli historian
Samuel A. Portnoy, American historian of Jewish and East European history 
George Posener, French Egyptologist
Michael Postan, British historian (Jewish Year Book 1985 p. 188)
Joshua Prawer, Israeli historian of the kingdom of Jerusalem and the crusades
Alfred Francis Pribram (de), Anglo-Austrian diplomatic historian.
Alfred Pribram, Austrian historian and publicist
Jacob Psantir, Rumanian historian of the Jews

R
Theodore Rabb, Renaissance historian
Ronald Radosh, American historian of espionage
Armin Rappaport, U.S. historian
Sidney Ratner, U.S. economic historian
Jehuda Reinharz, U.S.-Israeli historian of modern Jewish history
Ludwig Riess, German constitutional historian
Emanuel Ringelblum, Polish historian of Warsaw Ghetto
Maxime Rodinson, French historian
Samuele Romanin, Italian historian of classical Rome and Judaism
Nello Roselli, Italian historian
Ron Rosenbaum, American historian-journalist, author of Explaining Hitler (1998)
Arthur Rosenberg, German historian and Zionist
Nathan Rosenstein, American historian of the Roman Republic
Michael Alan Ross, American writer and author of BostonWalks The Jewish Friendship Trail Guidebook
Walt Whitman Rostow, American economic historian
Cecil Roth, British historian and editor of the Encyclopaedia Judaica
Hans Rothfels, German-born American historian
W.D.Rubinstein, American-born Australian historian in Britain
Suzanne Rutland, Australian historian

S
Abram L. Sachar, American historian
Howard M. Sachar, American historian
Julius Salomon, Danish historian and archivist
Simon Schama, British historian
J. Salwyn Schapiro, American historian of modern Europe
Leonard Schapiro, historian
Meyer Schapiro, Lithuanian-born American art historian
David Schoenbaum, modern German history
Moses Schorr, historian of Polish Jews
Debra Schultz, American feminist historian
Yossi Schwartz
Hugh Sebag-Montefiore, British World War 2 historian
Simon Sebag Montefiore, British historian of Russia
Tom Segev, Israeli historian
Arturo Segre, Italian political and commercial historian
Avraham Sela, Israeli historian
Enrique Semo, Mexican historian
Bernard Semmel, U.S. historian
Michael Shamah, British Archaeologist
Moshe Shamir, Israeli writer and historian
Leeor Shimron, American historian
Avi Shlaim, Israeli historian
Joseph Shulim, U.S. historian
Bernhard von Simson, German mediaevalist
Paul Simson, German historian
Charles Singer, British historian of science and medicine
Ephraim Avigdor Speiser, American assyriologist and archeologist
Louis Snyder, U.S. historian
Arthur Stein (historian), Austrian historian of classical Rome
Aurel Stein , archeologist
Henri Stein, French bibliographer and historian
Samuel Steinherz, Czechoslovakian mediaevalist
Alfred Stern, Swiss social historian
Fritz Stern, German-born American historian
Menahem Stern, Israeli historian of ancient Judaism
Zeev Sternhell, Israeli historian of French fascism
Barry Supple, British economic historian (Jewish Year Book, 2005, p. 215)

T
Hayim Tadmor, Assyriologist
Jacob Talmon, Israeli political and social historian
Frank Tannenbaum, U.S. economic historian
Rosa Levin Toubin, Jewish Texan historian
Hans Trefousse, U.S. historian
Barbara Tuchman, U.S. journalist and historian

U
Adam Ulam, Polish-born American historian of Marxism, Communism, and 20th Century Russian history
Irwin Unger, U.S. political and social historian

V
Geza Vermes, Hungarian-born British historian

W
Joanna Waley-Cohen, English historian now in New York
Bernard Wasserstein, British historian of the Middle East and Europe
Eugen Weber, Modern European History
Gerhard Weinberg, German-born American historian of World War Two
Robert Weinberg, American historian of Russia
Bernard Weisberger, U.S. historian
Eduard Wertheimer, Hungarian historian of the 19th century
Helene Wieruszowski, German-U.S. historian
Mordecai Wilensky, American/Israeli historian of Jewish history
Bertram Wolfe, U.S. Soviet historian
Michael Wolffsohn, Israeli-born German historian
Leonard Woolf, British historian of economics

Y
Zvy Yavetz, Israeli historian of ancient Rome
Yosef Hayim Yerushalmi (1932-2009), Jewish History, Culture & Society
Aryeh Yitzhaki, Israeli historian

Z
Abraham Zacuto, historian and scientist
Rehavam Zeevi, Israeli historian
Oscar Zeichner, U.S. historian
Alfred Zimmern, British political scientist and authority on International Relations
Carl A. Zimring, American environmental historian
Howard Zinn, American historian

References

Historians